Muna, Nepal  is a village development committee in Myagdi District in the Dhaulagiri Zone of western-central Nepal. At the time of the 1991 Nepal census it had a population of 2152 people living in 456 individual households.

References

UN map of the municipalities of Myagdi District

Populated places in Myagdi District